The 1920 United States Senate election in Pennsylvania was held on November 2, 1920. Incumbent Republican U.S. Senator Boies Penrose successfully sought re-election to another term, defeating Democratic nominee John A. Farrell.

General election

Candidates
John A. Farrell, West Chester physician (Democratic)
Joseph E. Jennings (Single Tax)
Leah C. Marion, treasurer of the Women's Christian Temperance Union (Prohibition)
Boies Penrose, incumbent U.S. Senator (Republican)
Robert J. Wheeler (Labor)
Birch Wilson, editor of the Reading Labor Advocate (Socialist)

Results

References

1920
Pennsylvania
United States Senate